Piñeyro may refer to:

Irma Piñeyro Arias (b. 1954), Mexican politician from the Revolutionary Institutional Party
Enrique Piñeyro (actor), Italian-born Argentine pilot turned film actor, director, producer, and screenwriter
Enrique Piñeyro Queralt, Spanish aristocrat and president of FC Barcelona between 1940 and 1943
Marcelo Piñeyro, Argentine film director, producer and screenwriter

See also
Pinheiro (disambiguation)
Piñeiro (disambiguation)